Rigacci is a surname. Notable people with the surname include:

 Susanna Rigacci (born 1960), Swedish-born Italian singer/soprano
  (1921–2019), Italian composer